William M. Black is a steam-propelled, sidewheel dustpan dredge, named for William Murray Black, now serving as a museum ship in the harbor of Dubuque, Iowa.  Built in 1934, she is one of a small number of surviving steam-powered dredges, and one of four surviving United States Army Corps of Engineers dredges.  She was declared a National Historic Landmark in 1992.  She is open for tours as part of the National Mississippi River Museum & Aquarium.

Description and history
William M. Black is located at the head of the Dubuque Harbor, where Ice Harbor Drive meets East 3rd Street. Her superstructure has three decks, supported by a network of steel I-beams, so that heavy equipment could be supported anywhere within her structure. The dustpan dredge is mounted in front, with winched cables on either side to hold the ship in place during dredging operations. The paddleboxes are located about 2/3 of the way down the hull. The pump that operated the dredge was located in a forward position, with its steam power plant located just aft of its position. One of the ship's paddlewheels has been removed, and is on display on the museum grounds.

According to information provided on the tour, William M. Black, one of the last paddle steamers built in the US, was used primarily along the Missouri River.  She had a crew of 49 and dredged  of material per day. She was placed out of service in 1973 because she consumed  of heavy oil each day, which became prohibitively expensive during the 1973 OPEC oil embargo.

See also
List of National Historic Landmarks in Iowa
National Register of Historic Places listings in Dubuque County, Iowa

References

National Historic Landmarks in Iowa
Dredgers
Museums in Dubuque, Iowa
National Register of Historic Places in Dubuque, Iowa
Ships on the National Register of Historic Places in Iowa
Museum ships in Iowa
Steamboats of the Missouri River
1934 ships